Mandi State was a native state of British India, within the Punjab; with Mandi, Himachal Pradesh as its capital. The state of Mandi (the name means "market" in Hindi), which included two towns and 3,625 villages, was part of the States of the Punjab Hills. It was located in the Himalayan range, bordering to the west, north, and east on the British Punjabi district of Kangra; to the south, on Suket; and to the southwest, on Bilaspur.

History
The predecessor state of Siokot was founded in 1527. Formerly part of the Kingdom of Suket in the Punjab Hills, the dynasty traditionally goes back to 765AD. In about 1100, Vijaya Sen had two sons, Sahu Sen who ruled over Suket and Bahu Sen who ruled over Kullu. Bahu Sen’s descendants emigrated to Kullu until the tenth descendant, Kabakha Sen was killed by the Raja of Kullu and his son had to flee to Siokot, not very far from the present city of Mandi which was founded during Ajbar Sen’s rule.

Ruling family

The rulers bore the title of Raja.

Raja AJBAR SEN, 1st Raja of Mandi 1527/1534, he made Mandi his capital, married and had issue. He died 1534.

Raja CHHATAR SEN, 2nd Raja of Mandi 1534/1554, married and had issue.

Raja SAHIB SEN, 3rd Raja of Mandi 1554/1575 or 1534/1554, married Rani Prakash Devi, daughter of Raja Bikram Chand of Bilaspur, and had issue.

Raja NARAIN SEN, 4th Raja of Mandi 1575/1595 or 1554/1574, he defeated the Ranas of Ner, Bandoh and Chuhar, and claimed their territory, later in life he became paralytic but was cured by a pir.

Raja KESHAB SEN, 5th Raja of Mandi 1595/1616 or 1574/1604, married and had issue.

Raja HARI SEN, 6th Raja of Mandi 1616/1637 or 1604/1637, married and had issue. He died 1637 or 1623.

Raja SURAJ SEN, 7th Raja of Mandi 1637/1664 or 1623/1658, he was defeated into two battles with the Raja of Kullu, and one with the Raja of Guler, 

Raja SHYAM SEN, 8th Raja of Mandi 1664/1679 or 1658/1673, 

Raja GAUR SEN, 9th Raja of Mandi 1679/1684 or 1673/1678, .

Raja SIDHI SEN, 10th Raja of Mandi 1684/1727 or 1678/1719, 

Raja SHAMSHER SEN, 11th Raja of Mandi 1727/1781, born 1722, .

Raja SURMA SEN, 12th Raja of Mandi 1781/1788, 

Raja ISHWARI SEN, 13th Raja of Mandi 1788/1826, born 1784, 

Raja ZALIM SEN, 14th Raja of Mandi 1826/1839. , 

Raja BIJAI SEN, 16th Raja of Mandi 1851/1902, born 1846, K.C.S.I [cr.1884]; he was formally installed on 12 October 1866, 

Raja BHAWANI SEN, 17th Raja of Mandi 1902/1912, born 17 April 1883, educated at Aitchison Chiefs College, Lahore; 

Maj. HH Raja Sir JOGINDER SEN Bahadur, 18th Raja of Mandi 1913/1986, son of Mian Kishan Singh Sahib, born 20 August 1904, K.C.S.I. [cr.1931], educated at Queen Mary's College and Aitchison College, Lahore; Indian Ambassador to Brazil 1952/56; Member of Lok Sabha 1957/62; Honorary Lt.-Col. 3rd/17th Dogra Regiment and Bengal Sappers and Miners, married 1stly, 8 February 1923, HH Rani Amrit Kaur, born 1904, died 1948, daughter of Col. HH Farzand i-Dilband Rasikhul-Itiqad Daulat-i-Inglishia Raja-i-Rajgan Maharaja Sir Jagatjit Singh Bahadur of Kapurthala, and his wife, Rani Kanari, married 2ndly, 13 May 1930, Kumari Kusum Kumari [HH Rani Kusum Kumari of Mandi], born 27 August 1913, died June 1998, daughter of Kunwar Prithiraj Sinhji of Rajpipla, and had issue, two sons and two daughters. He died 16 June 1986.

HH Raja Ashokpal Sen [Prince Bebu] (by HH Rani Kusum Kumari) (qv)

Demographics

Religion

See also
List of Indian princely states

Notes

References

External links 

History of Himachal Pradesh (1947–present)
13th-century establishments in India
1290 establishments in Asia
1948 disestablishments in India
Political integration of India
Princely states of Punjab
Mandi district
Rajputs